The Mekong Club Championship was an ASEAN club competition for men's association football clubs. Five teams entered as respective domestic league winners from Cambodia, Laos, Myanmar, Thailand and Vietnam. The championship was sponsored by Toyota.

History
In 2014, Toyota Motor wanted to develop in aspiring football players and football fans in the countries alongside the Mekong River: Cambodia, Laos, Myanmar and Vietnam, so Toyota debuted the competition called Mekong Club Championship. The first competition was held in 2014 at Bình Dương, Vietnam with four countries participating. Becamex Bình Dương became the first club that won the championship. The second competition was held in 2015, with Thailand joining.

Trophy

Results

Statistics

Performance by club

Participating by club

Performance by nation

Nation performances 

DNP = Did not participate
GS = Group stage

Top scorers

References

External links
 Official site

 
AFF competitions
Recurring sporting events established in 2014
2014 establishments in Asia
Annual sporting events